Convoy PQ 18 was the last of the PQ/QP series of arctic convoys during World War II, bound from US and British ports via Reykjavík in Iceland to the Barents Sea and White Sea ports of the Soviet Union, particularly Murmansk and Archangel. The convoy sailed on 2 September 1942 and arrived three weeks later on 21 September 1942. It was opposed by German sea and air forces based in occupied Norway.

The convoy comprised forty merchant ships and four naval auxiliaries, plus contingents to and from Iceland in relays (48 in all) and was defended by a close escort, a "Fighting Destroyer Escort", local escort forces and two distant escort forces (74 warships in total). These were supported by aircraft of the RAF based in the Soviet Union.

The German forces comprised a U-boat Wolfpack ( Ice Palace), of twelve U-Boats and a surface attack force of eight warships, though in the event these were not engaged.

Allied forces

Merchant ships

Escorts

Support forces

Axis forces

U-boats

Surface ships

Notes

References

External links
 Arnold Hague: PQ 18 at convoyweb

PQ-18
Convoy PQ 18